The 15269 / 15270 Muzaffarpur–Ahmedabad Jan Sadharan Express is a Jan Sadharan Express train belonging to Indian Railways East Central Railway zone that runs between  and  in India.

It operates as train number 15269 from Muzaffarpur Junction to Ahmedabad Junction and as train number 15270 in the reverse direction, serving the states of  Bihar, Uttar Pradesh, Rajasthan & Gujarat.

Coaches
The 15269 / 70 Muzaffarpur Junction–Ahmedabad Junction Jan Sadharan Express has 21 general unreserved & two SLR (seating with luggage rake) coaches . It does not carry a pantry car.

As is customary with most train services in India, coach composition may be amended at the discretion of Indian Railways depending on demand.

Service

Schedule

Routing

Rake composition

 21 General
 1 Second Sitting 
 2 Second-class Luggage/parcel van

Traction
As the route is now fully electrified, a Howrah Loco Shed-based WAP-7 electric locomotive pulls the train for its entire journey.

References

External links
15269 Jan Sadharan Express at India Rail Info
15270 Jan Sadharan Express at India Rail Info

Transport in Ahmedabad
Rail transport in Gujarat
Rail transport in Rajasthan
Rail transport in Uttar Pradesh
Rail transport in Bihar
Transport in Muzaffarpur
Jan Sadharan Express trains